WHSD (88.5 FM) is an American non-commercial educational radio station licensed to serve the community of Hinsdale, Illinois. The station's broadcast license is held by Hinsdale Township High School District #86. The station was assigned the call sign "WHSD" by the Federal Communications Commission.

WHSD broadcasts a high school radio format serving Hinsdale Central High School and Hinsdale South High School. Sunday through early Wednesday are run as "Hinsdale South Radio" and late Wednesday through Saturday as "Hinsdale Central Radio".

External links
WHSD Facebook

WHSD tower photographs

HSD
HSD
High school radio stations in the United States
Radio stations established in 1971